This is a list of glaciers existing in Turkey, currently or in recent centuries. They are retreating due to climate change in Turkey.

Turkey's glaciers are mainly in the:
 Taurus Mountains,
 Eastern Black Sea Mountains,
 Dormant and extinct volcanoes.

Taurus Mountains glaciers 
Although there are no glaciers in the Western Taurus Mountains, there are some small glaciers in the Central Taurus. The Southeastern Taurus holds 65% of Turkey's current glaciers.
 Southeastern Taurus glaciers:
 Uludoruk Glacier (Cilo Mountain)
 Mia Hvara Glacier (Cilo Mountain)
 Erinç Glacier (Suppa Durek Glacier) (Cilo Mountain)
 Geverok Glacier (Sat Mountain)
 Kavuşşahap Mountain Glacier
 Central Taurus glaciers: 
 Lolut Glacier (Aladağ)
 Bolkar Mountains and Dedegöl Mountain glaciers

Eastern Black Sea Mountains glaciers 
Most of the glaciers in the Eastern Black Sea Mountains are in the Kaçkar Mountains, which are the highest peaks of the region.
 Kaçkar Mountains glaciers:
 Kaçkar I, II, III glaciers
 Krenek I, II glaciers
 Dübe Glacier
 Verçenik Mountain glaciers:
 Sinançor Glacier
 Dilektepe Glacier
 Altıparmak Mountains Kırmızıgedik Glacier
 Bulut Mountains Avucur Glacier
 Soğanlı Mountain small glaciers
 Gâvur Mountain Avliyana Glacier
 Giresun Mountain small glaciers

Glaciers on dormant and extinct volcanoes 
Glaciers are found on Turkey's three important stratovolcanos:
 Mount Ararat summit glacier
 Süphan Mountain valley glacier
 Erciyes Mountain valley glacier

Sources
 Çiner, A. (February 2003). Türkiye'nin güncel buzulları ve Geç Kuvaterner buzul çökelleri. Türkiye Jeoloji Bülteni 46(1): 55-78.

References

 
Glaciers